Rebecca Brown is an American novelist, essayist, playwright, artist, and professor. She was the first writer in residence at Richard Hugo House, co-founder of the Jack Straw Writers Program, and served as the creative director of literature at Centrum in Port Townsend, Washington from 2005 to 2009. Brown's best-known work is her novel The Gifts of the Body, which won a Lambda Literary Award in 1994. Rebecca Brown is an Emeritus faculty member in the MFA in Creative Writing Program at Goddard College in Plainfield, Vermont and is also a multi-media artist whose work has been displayed in galleries such as the Frye Art Museum.

Early life
Brown was born into a Navy family that moved often; she lived in California, Texas, Kansas, and Spain. She has a brother and sister. She earned a bachelor's in English from George Washington University and a Master's in Creative Writing from the University of Virginia. After finishing her MFA in the early 1980s, she settled in Seattle before moving to live in London and Italy for several years. She returned to Seattle in 1990 and has been there since. Brown's mother, Barbara Ann Wildman Brown, passed away from cancer in 1997; the experience of being her caretaker inspired the book Excerpts from a Family Medical Dictionary. Her father, who left the family when Brown was a teenager, died from a heart attack shortly after her mother; his death inspired The End of Youth.

Career
Brown's works include collections of essays and short stories, a fictionalized autobiography, a modern bestiary, a memoir in the guise of a medical dictionary, a libretto for a dance opera, a play, and various kinds of fantasy. Brown has "a uniquely recognizable voice, writing as she does in a stark style that combines the minimalism of Ernest Hemingway with some of the incantatory rhythms of Gertrude Stein." She shares some personal preferences with the latter.

Brown wrote and performed her one-woman production Monstrous, a look at some of literature's monsters and how they don't fit anywhere, at the Northwest Film Forum in 2013. She has also written a play, The Toaster, which debuted at Seattle's  New City Theater in 2005, and a dance opera called The Onion Twins for the BetterBiscuitDance Company. In 2001, the About Face Theater in Chicago adapted The Terrible Girls into a play. New Short Fiction Series in Los Angeles adapted four different stories from The End of Youth to stage in 2003.

She has been part of the faculties of the University of Washington Bothell, Evergreen State College, and Goddard College and has taught at Naropa University's Jack Kerouac School and Pacific Lutheran University. In addition to Hugo House, Brown has also done residencies at Yaddo, Hawthornden Castle, MacDowell, Centrum, Millay Arts, and Hedgebrook.

Personal life
Brown lives in Capitol Hill, Seattle with her wife Chris Galloway and their cats. She has been a practicing Roman Catholic since 2012.

Honors and awards
In 2005, she was awarded the Stranger Genius Award and given a $5,000 grant.

Selected works

References

External links

Interview with Brown and writing samples from the Seattle Post-Intelligencer
Rebecca Brown: Literary Subversions of Homonormalization, which discusses the entire oeuvre of Rebecca Brown
Brown's articles and reviews for the Seattle newspaper The Stranger

20th-century American novelists
Lambda Literary Award for Lesbian Fiction winners
American lesbian writers
LGBT people from Washington (state)
Living people
Writers from Seattle
21st-century American novelists
American LGBT novelists
American women novelists
20th-century American women writers
21st-century American women writers
Novelists from Washington (state)
1956 births
Lesbian academics
LGBT Roman Catholics
Converts to Roman Catholicism
Catholics from Washington (state)